Clipped is a video featuring five tracks by the Australian hard rock band AC/DC. First released in 1991, it contained three tracks from The Razors Edge and two from Blow Up Your Video.

In 2002 a DVD version was released which also included videos for the songs "Big Gun" (from the Last Action Hero soundtrack) and "Hard as a Rock" (from Ballbreaker).

The photograph on the cover was first used in 1990 for the single "Are You Ready".

Track listing
"Thunderstruck"
"Moneytalks"
"Are You Ready"
"Heatseeker"
"That's the Way I Wanna Rock 'n' Roll"

All songs written by Young, Young, except "Heatseeker" and "That's the Way I Wanna Rock 'n' Roll", by Young, Johnson, Young.

Personnel
Brian Johnson - lead vocals
Angus Young - lead guitar
Malcolm Young - rhythm guitar, backing vocals
Cliff Williams - bass guitar, backing vocals
Chris Slade - drums, percussion
Simon Wright - drums on "Heatseeker" and "That's the Way I Wanna Rock 'n' Roll"
Phil Rudd - drums on "Hard as a Rock" on DVD

AC/DC video albums
1991 video albums
Music video compilation albums
1991 compilation albums